The Covenant Party was a political party in the Commonwealth of the Northern Mariana Islands (CNMI) advocating governmental and financial reform. It was named after the Covenant to Establish a Commonwealth of the Northern Mariana Islands in Political Union with the United States of America, Act of Mar. 24, 1976, Pub. L. 94-241, 90 Stat. 263, codified as amended at 48 U.S.C. § 1801 note. In the legislative elections of 2003, the Covenant Party won nine of eighteen seats. The party mostly made up of members from the Republican Party, but many prominent Democrats would also join the party. In the 2005 general elections, the Covenant Party increased its position as one of the strongest parties in the Commonwealth when Benigno R. Fitial, the party's gubernatorial candidate, won the election. The Covenant Party won seven of eighteen seats in the commonwealth's House of Representatives and three of nine seats in its Senate. In the Commonwealth Legislature 2007 elections, the Covenant Party won only four of twenty seats in the House of Representatives.

In December 2010, Governor Benigno Fitial proposed that the Covenant Party merge with the Republican Party. Republican and Covenant Party leaders rejected the proposal, and the Covenant Party contested the 2012 midterm elections. Governor Benigno Fitial would leave the Covenant Party and rejoin the GOP, passing leadership to Eloy Inos. In 2012, the Covenant Party endorsed independent Congressman Gregorio Kilili Camacho Sablan whom Benigno Fitial wants replaced with a Republican in the 2012 elections.

In September 2013, Governor Eloy Inos again tried to merge the Covenant Party with the Republican Party. The party is considered de facto dissolved when Inos departed the party and rejoined the GOP in 2013. Many left the party soon after, most moving to the Republican Party, making it a de facto GOP absorption of the Covenant Party. On August 19, 2021, during an interview on the 2022 gubernatorial election, Lt. Gov. Arnold I. Palacios mentioned that the GOP did vote to approve the merger in 2013.

References

Political parties in the Northern Mariana Islands
2001 establishments in the Northern Mariana Islands
Political parties established in 2001